WWE NXT initially debuted in 2010 as a seasonal show which was presented as a hybrid between WWE's scripted live event shows and reality television, in which talent from WWE's developmental territory Florida Championship Wrestling (FCW) participated in a competition to become WWE's next "breakout star", with the help of mentors from WWE's Raw and SmackDown brands. Five seasons of this iteration were broadcast, with Wade Barrett, Kaval, Kaitlyn, and Johnny Curtis being announced as winners, and the last season ending without a resolution.

Season 1 

The first season of NXT began airing on Syfy on February 23, 2010 and ended on June 1, 2010. The majority of the season one cast was revealed a week before the premiere on the series finale of ECW. However, before the season's premiere aired Skip Sheffield's Pro was changed with William Regal replacing the announced Montel Vontavious Porter (MVP). Near the end of the season, several changes were made to the original plan of the format. The season was shortened from the planned 17 episodes to 15 episodes. In the first elimination episode that aired on May 11, both Daniel Bryan and Michael Tarver were eliminated by WWE management and removed from that night's Pros' Poll after both made comments about wanting to be voted off. The show ended with three eliminations, with Sheffield ranked last in the Poll. Carlito was released on May 21 for refusing rehab after violating WWE's Wellness Program. Subsequent Pros' Polls were held without him for the rest of the season. The winner of season one was Wade Barrett. Immediately after the conclusion of season one, the Rookies were used in a storyline that had them forming an alliance called The Nexus. Led by Barrett, the group invaded the first Raw following the conclusion of season one in an attempt to gain WWE contracts for the losers of NXT. The invasion consisted of the group attacking John Cena as well as other wrestlers and WWE personnel. Barrett announced that he would invoke his title shot at Night of Champions for the WWE Championship in a six-pack elimination challenge. At Night of Champions on September 19, Barrett lost in his title match to Randy Orton.

Contestants

Poll results 
 – Winner of competition
 – Safe in competition
 – Eliminated from competition by Pros' Poll
 – Eliminated from competition by WWE management
 – Won immunity prior to that particular poll and is ineligible to be eliminated

Season 2 

The second season of NXT started on June 8, 2010 and ended on August 31, 2010. The season 2 cast was revealed on the first season finale on June 1. The season was originally planned to last 12 weeks. However, it was later extended to 13 weeks. In this season, the polls were different as rankings were based half on Pro votes and half on votes from fans via WWE's official website. The first poll was shown on July 6. Originally, the polls format was set to match the previous season, with a non-elimination poll followed by weekly elimination polls on July 27. However, the first poll was made a surprise elimination round on the night with a second elimination poll held on August 3 instead. In addition, a double elimination stipulation was added to the fourth NXT poll on August 17. The winner of the season was Kaval. Along with Kaval, Alex Riley was immediately promoted to aid his Pro The Miz on the Raw brand. On November 21, Kaval invoked his title shot at Survivor Series for the Intercontinental Championship against the reigning champion Dolph Ziggler, but he was defeated. Kaval was released from his contract in December 2010.

Contestants

Poll results 
 – Winner of competition
 – Safe in competition
 – Eliminated from competition by NXT Poll
 – Won immunity prior to that particular poll and is ineligible to be eliminated

Season 3 

The third season of NXT started on September 7, 2010 and ended on November 30, 2010. The season was exclusive to female wrestlers and was the second different contest produced by WWE to find new female wrestlers, the first being the Divas Searches held from 2003–2007. The first four episodes of season three were aired on Syfy. Due to the debut of SmackDown on Syfy on October 1, NXT left the channel and became a webcast at WWE.com for visitors from the United States from October 5 onwards. A new interactive website for NXT was also launched at the beginning of the season to accommodate the move. The reward to the victor was changed in contrast to the previous seasons. Unlike the first two male victors, the female victor of season three would not get a shot at a title of her choice (the only title being the Divas Championship), but rather a WWE contract. Other changes in the third season include a greater emphasis on challenges for the first three polls where the winner of the most challenges before the next upcoming poll would be awarded immunity. The first elimination poll took place five weeks into the competition. The majority of the season three cast was revealed on the second-season finale on August 31. However, before the season's premiere aired prospective rookie wrestler Aloisia was dropped from the show. On screen, Aloisia's exit stemmed from an argument between Aloisia and her Pro Vickie Guerrero, forcing Guerrero to fire her. In reality, it was reported that Aloisia was allegedly dropped from the show after pornographic photos of her were leaked onto the Internet. However, in an interview Aloisia herself was unsure whether this was the reason for her exit or not. Guerrero later revealed her new rookie in the season three premiere to be Kaitlyn, who would ultimately win the season.

Contestants 

† Originally slated to be Lindsay Kay Hayward as Aloisia, who had previously wrestled as Isis the Amazon.

Poll results 
 – Winner of competition
 – Safe in competition
 – Eliminated from competition by NXT Poll
 – Won immunity prior to that particular poll and is ineligible to be eliminated

Season 4 

The fourth season of NXT started on December 7, 2010 and ended on March 1, 2011. Returning to the male-orientated format of the first two seasons, the season four cast was revealed on the third-season finale on November 30. In a change from the third season, "immunity points" were now rewarded to the winner of each challenge, which vary depending on the challenge's difficulty. The person with the most points before the next upcoming poll is then awarded immunity from that poll. On the January 4, episode of NXT, it was announced that the winner would earn a WWE Tag Team Championship match with their respective Pro as their partner. That same night, Dolph Ziggler won a battle royal consisting of each of the Pros and as a result was able to trade off his Rookie Jacob Novak for Byron Saxton, who was originally mentored by Chris Masters. Similarly on the February 1 episode of NXT, a fatal four-way elimination match was held between the remaining four Rookies. Brodus Clay won and as a result was able to trade off his Pros The Million Dollar Couple (Ted DiBiase and Maryse) for Alberto Del Rio, who was originally mentoring Conor O'Brian before O'Brian's elimination on January 25. The winner of the season was Johnny Curtis, earning himself and his Pro R-Truth a shot at the tag team titles. On April 18, R-Truth turned into a villain by attacking John Morrison and subsequently R-Truth and Curtis never invoked their shot at the titles. Curtis would eventually debut on the main roster in June when he stated that he would not be challenging for the tag team titles with R-Truth and instead used his title shot with season two runner-up Michael McGillicutty on the October 11, 2012 episode of NXT against Team Hell No for the WWE Tag Team Championship, but was defeated.

Contestants

Poll results 
 – Winner of competition
 – Safe in competition
 – Eliminated from competition by NXT Poll
 – Won immunity prior to that particular poll and is ineligible to be eliminated

NXT Redemption (season 5) 

NXT Redemption, the fifth season of NXT, started on March 8, 2011. The season consisted of seven rookies chosen from the previous male-only seasons and initially followed a similar format to the previous four seasons, with the winner of season 5 stated to win a spot in the planned sixth season of NXT alongside a WWE pro of their choice. No eliminations took place for the first 10 weeks of the show and following the elimination of Conor O'Brian after 17 weeks Derrick Bateman replaced him as a new Rookie contestant. The show's competition format was then gradually and quietly forgotten about (although it was never officially dropped), the Pros ceased to appear and NXT Redemption subsequently morphed into its own entity, featuring self-contained storylines and matches involving long-tenured lower-card performers such as Tyson Kidd, Maxine, Yoshi Tatsu, JTG, Trent Baretta, Kaitlyn, Johnny Curtis, Percy Watson, Tyler Reks, AJ Lee, Curt Hawkins and Michael McGillicutty, among others. After 59 weeks, Darren Young and Titus O'Neil were moved to the SmackDown roster on April 18, 2012, leaving Bateman as the sole remaining Rookie on the show, though he was not declared the winner and new episodes continued to be taped until June 12. The final episode of NXT Redemption aired on June 13, after which the show ended with no conclusion, with a "new NXT" advertised for the following week. In total, NXT Redemption ran for over a year and 67 episodes were produced, exceeding the total number of episodes for all previous seasons combined. The first season was a distant second at 15 episodes.

Contestants

Poll results

"Lost" season 
In May and June 2017, WWE published an article and a video detailing a planned and subsequently cancelled season of NXT which was to feature the following wrestlers:
 Big E Langston
 Bo Dallas
 Damien Sandow
 Jinder Mahal
 Hunico
 Leo Kruger
 Seth Rollins
 Xavier Woods

References

Seasons